

France
 French Somaliland – Jacques Marie Julien Compain, Governor of French Somaliland (1958–1962)

Portugal
 Angola – 
 Álvaro Rodrigues da Silva Tavares, High Commissioner of Angola (1960–1961)
 Verâncio Augusto Deslandes, High Commissioner of Angola (1961–1962)

United Kingdom
 Aden – Sir Charles Johnston, Governor of Aden (1960–1963)
 Malta Colony – Sir Guy Grantham, Governor of Malta (1959–1962)
 Northern Rhodesia – Sir Evelyn Dennison Hone, Governor of Northern Rhodesia (1959–1964)

Colonial governors
Colonial governors
1961